, commonly known as TGS, is a video game trade fair and convention held annually in September in the Makuhari Messe, in Chiba, Japan. It is presented by the Computer Entertainment Supplier's Association (CESA) and Nikkei Business Publications, Inc. The main focus of the show is on Japanese games, but some international video game developers use it to showcase upcoming releases/related hardware. The duration of the event is four days. The first two days of Tokyo Game Show are open only to industry attendees (business) and the general public can attend during the final two days.

History 

The first Tokyo Game Show was held in 1996. From 1996 to 2002, the show was held twice a year: once in the Spring and once in Autumn (in the Tokyo Big Sight). Since 2002, the show has been held once a year. It attracts more visitors every year. 2011’s show hosted over 200,000 attendees and the 2012 show bringing in 223,753. The busiest TGS was in 2016 with 271,224 people in attendance and 614 companies had exhibits. The event has been held annually since 1996 and was never canceled, however the 2020 and 2021 editions were online only as a result of the COVID-19 pandemic. The 2022 edition returned to in-person exhibits. The 20th anniversary of TGS was celebrated in 2016.
The 2016 attendance record was topped by 2018's attendance of 298,690 people.

Layout 
The TGS layout varies per year. Such as in 2015, Tokyo Game Show showcased 11 exhibition areas consisting of business, general public, education and other areas to buy merchandise.

General Exhibition 

The General Exhibition Area is the heart of the show, taking up the largest amount of space, and is held where digital gaming entertainment or any related products or services are showcased. Many well-known companies such as Namco Bandai, Capcom, Sony Computer Entertainment and Square Enix have demo areas here, in addition to emerging companies.

Game Device 
This area covers gaming devices such as headphones, controllers, furniture and other devices associated with home-use gaming consoles and portable gaming devices.

Asia New Stars 
An exhibition introduced at the 2012 Tokyo Game Show is geared towards introducing emerging game developers from Asia.

Merchandise Sales 
This area is designated for merchandising of game-related goods. Vendors include Konami and Square-Enix.

Smartphone and social games 
This area focuses on games for smart devices (smartphones and tablets) and social games. Despite record numbers during TGS 2012, many large companies had a smaller presence. For example, Microsoft, which previously had one of the largest booths, was absent in 2012. Social and mobile gaming surged, filling the gap. Microsoft returned to the show in 2013 with the release of the Xbox One.

Personal computing 
The PC area houses major Japanese computing companies, showcasing products such as Japanese desktop and notebook computers.

Children 
This area showcases new games that are aimed at a younger audience. Companies such as Taito and Sega are housed there.

Game school 
The Game School area showcases information on Japanese universities and colleges offering information about digital art, animation, computer programming, and other programs of study related to the video game industry. These booths also display student work. It houses colleges such as Numazu Professional College of Information Technology and Tokyo Designer Gakuin College.

Sales 
This is the main area in the games convention where most of the sales and business transactions between companies and consumers are carried out. Companies housed there include Nikkei Business Publications.

Cosplay 

The Tokyo Game Show attracts many cosplayers. Cure, Japan's largest cosplay community website, hosts Cosplay Collection Night, a parade in stage show with more than 100 cosplayers on Saturday's night. The show starts from 6:30pm until 8 pm and it is hosted by Yunmao Ayakawa and Tatsumi Inui from the production team company CURE World Cosplay, with background music by DJ & MC: WAN. The participants are members of Worldcosplay website with a few international cosplayers that win a contest in several countries like Spain, Philippines, South Korea, Singapore, Indonesia, Turkey, USA, China and more.

Business solutions 
This is the main business area and is not open to the public.

Cloud/data center pavilion 
The Cloud/Data Center is dedicated to improving infrastructure and environment of social and network games.

Street Fighter tournaments
The Tokyo Game Show has featured a Mad Catz-sponsored Street Fighter tournament since 2014. The competition is part of Capcom's official Pro Tour, making it a qualifying event for the Capcom Cup. The 2016 event was the first to not be sponsored by Mad Catz, as the company got in severe financial trouble during its 2016 fiscal year.

Sense of Wonder Night 
Sense of Wonder Night (SOWN) is a presentation session held yearly at the TGS for showcasing innovative and experimental computer games mainly made by small game studios and independent game developers from all over the world, similar to and inspired by the GDC Experimental Gameplay Workshop . The first edition was held in 2008. Among former and current judges are Keita Takahashi and Simon Carless.

See also 
Asia Game Show
Brasil Game Show
Gamescom
Electronic Entertainment Expo (E3)
Gamercom
Game Developers Conference

References

External links 

 

1996 establishments in Japan
Culture in Tokyo
Recurring events established in 1996
Video game trade shows
Video gaming in Japan